This is a list of films produced by the Tollywood film industry based in Hyderabad, Telangana in 1968.

Dubbed films

External links
 Earliest Telugu language films at IMDb.com (495 to 537)

1968
Telugu
Telugu films